Sludgeworth is an American punk rock band from Chicago consisting of Dan Schafer (vocals), Adam White (guitar), Dave McClean (guitar), Mike Hootenstrat (bass), and Brian Vermin (drums).

The band was formed in 1989 as a side project from Screeching Weasel, a band that Dan and Brian were in. Later that year, the two decided to leave Screeching Weasel to focus full-time on Sludgeworth. The band released their first EP in 1990, followed by a full-length album in 1991.  That same year, Dan Schafer joined a resurrected Screeching Weasel.  Sludgeworth announced their split in late 1992.  The breakup was due to musical differences between Schafer and the other members, with the former wanting to continue playing pop punk and the others wanting to not be restricted by that definition. Sludgeworth played their last show in early 1993.  The rest of the group formed Ethyline (initially called Pound) with a new singer.  In 1995, a collection of their music was released by Lookout! Records on the album "Losers of the Year". In 2007, the band announced they would reunite for that year's Riot Fest.  The group also appeared at Insubordination Fest in 2008, which resulted in a live CD/DVD release.

Discography
Sludgeworth 7-inch EP (Roadkill Records, 1990)
What's This? LP/CD (Johann's Face Records, 1991)
"Anytime" b/w "You and I" 7-inch single (self-released, 1992)
Losers of the Year CD (Lookout Records, 1995) - A compilation of selected songs from What's This?, plus the "Anytime" single and unreleased tracks.
Insubordination Fest '08: Live From Baltimore CD/DVD (Insubordination Records, 2009) - Reunion show recorded June 28, 2008, at Insubordination Fest in Baltimore, MD.

References

Punk rock groups from Illinois
Musical groups from Chicago